National Democratic Mass Organization (NDMO) is a collective term in the Philippines for sectoral mass organizations that subscribe to National Democratic principles, often erroneously accused as a popular front for the Communist Party of the Philippines, while not being officially affiliated.

These organizations are frequently red-tagged by the Philippine government and the military, as NDMOs recognize, but do not openly support, the Communist rebellion in the Philippines because of their belief that the roots of poverty such as imperialism, feudalism, and "bureaucrat capitalism" are still very much alive in the Philippines. In a statement, Bagong Alyansang Makabayan (Bayan) secretary-general Renato Reyes explained that they refuse to condemn armed struggle in the Philippines because they claim that doing so “will only lead to the denial of the social basis of armed conflict and falls right into the militarist approach.”

Notable examples of NDMOs in the country include Anakbayan, League of Filipino Students, Alliance of Concerned Teachers, Anakpawis, GABRIELA, and Kabataan Partylist.

References

Left-wing militant groups in the Philippines
National Democracy Movement (Philippines)